Amelora macarta is a moth of the  family Geometridae. It is found in the Australian Capital Territory and Tasmania.

External links

Australian Faunal Directory
Australian Insects

Moths of Australia
Nacophorini
Moths described in 1919